"A Warning to the Curious" is a ghost story by British writer M. R. James, included in his book A Warning to the Curious and Other Ghost Stories first published in 1925. The tale tells the story of Paxton, an antiquarian and archaeologist who holidays in "Seaburgh" (a disguised version of Aldeburgh, Suffolk) and inadvertently stumbles across one of the three lost crowns of East Anglia, which legendarily protect the country from invasion. Upon digging up the crown, Paxton is stalked by its supernatural guardian. Written a few years after the end of the First World War, "A Warning to the Curious" ranks as one of M. R. James's bleakest stories.

Synopsis
The story is written in M. R. James's typical style, and uses a multi-layered narrative device to tell the tale. Time is taken to describe a pleasant traditional Victorian holiday resort, Seaburgh. The narrator states that he collects stories about the area as a result of his happy memories there as a child, and that this is one he was told by a man for whom he had done a favour.

We now hear the story first-hand from the second narrator. He states that he was on holiday at Seaburgh with his friend, Henry Long, when they are approached by another guest, Paxton, who has a tale of woe to tell.

Paxton explains that he has some interest in the architecture of medieval churches, whilst visiting one such place he learns of a local legend about a buried Anglo-Saxon crown that protects the country from invasion; linked to this are a deceased family, called Ager, who were sworn to guard the crown.

Paxton states that he found the crown but has been stalked ever since, to the point of desperation, by its supernatural guardian. Both the narrator and Long are moved by Paxton's story, and decide to help him return the crown. During their successful mission, both men have some appreciation of being under surveillance by a supernatural presence.

The next day the narrator and Long are to meet Paxton for a walk, but discover him gone; a servant states that she saw Paxton running towards the beach, having heard his friends call for him. The two men set off after Paxton onto the beach, where a thick sea mist descends, making visibility poor. The two men come across Paxton's body; he has met a violent end. An independent witness at the subsequent inquest absolves them of any involvement. The narrator states that they keep the location of the crown secret, finishing by saying that he has never been back, or even near Seaburgh, since.

Adaptations
In 1972, the story was adapted as ‘’A Warning to the Curious’’ by Lawrence Gordon Clark as the second instalment of the BBC's A Ghost Story for Christmas strand. As with the previous instalment, it was first broadcast on BBC 1 at 11pm on Christmas Eve 1972.

In adapting the story, Clark changed the protagonist of the original from a young, innocent amateur who discovers the crown by accident to a middle-aged man (Peter Vaughan) who travels to Seaburgh specifically to find the crown. The era is updated to the 1930s, the background of the Depression adding an extra layer to Paxton's search for the treasure. The narrative layering of the original James story is dispensed with and a chronological narrative is used instead.

Clark also included the character of Dr. Black (Clive Swift), who first appeared in The Stalls of Barchester. The adaptation was filmed around the north Norfolk coastline at Waxham, Happisburgh and Wells-next-the-Sea.

In 2020, the story was adapted by Shadows at the Door: The Podcast into a full-cast audio drama. In this adaptation, Paxton's gender was changed from male to female and the character of the narrator was expanded.

Aldeburgh
The Suffolk setting of Seaburgh for "A Warning to the Curious" is a thinly veiled disguise for the seaside town of Aldeburgh, the home of M. R. James's maternal grandmother, whom he visited frequently until her death in 1870. The town suffers from the coastal erosion common to the east coast, but the majority of buildings mentioned in the story survive to this day; the Martello tower still stands and has been converted into a holiday residence by The Landmark Trust. The Bear/White Lion hotel is a luxury hotel still, St Peter and St Paul's Church, Aldeburgh and the accompanying path through the graveyard similarly are relatively untouched. A few miles outside Aldeburgh is the small village of Friston, which is home to a church dating back to the medieval period and is likely the basis for Froston in the story, though it lacks the Three Crown motif.

References

External links

 

BBC television dramas
British supernatural television shows
British ghost films
Short stories by M. R. James
Horror short stories